Saint-Waast is a commune in the Nord department in northern France.

Heraldry

Local Culture and Heritage

See also
Communes of the Nord department

References

Saintwaast